Moulvi Syed Qudratullah Sattar Munsef, (born 1750) was a Bengali judge and entrepreneur. He is best known as the founder of Town of Moulvibazar, which is also the name for eponymous district and upazila in Bangladesh.

Early life
Qudratullah was born in 1750 to a noble Bengali Muslim Syed family in the village of Gavindasri in Chowallish Pargana, Srihatta Sarkar, Bengal Subah. During this time, the Bengal Subah was under the Mughal Empire ruled by Ahmad Shah Bahadur. However, as the empire was weakening and declining, the provincial Nawab of Bengal, Alivardi Khan had more control over the Bengal Subah.

Qudratullah's father was Syed Hurmotullah, a son of Syed Shah Yasin. Yasin was the paternal nephew of Shah Mustafa - a Muslim preacher associated with spreading Islam to present-day Moulvibazar. Yasin married Kata Bibi, who was from Shah Mustafa's lineage. Qudratullah's three brothers were Muhibullah, Dana-Ullah and Dayem-Ullah. This led to Qudratullah being brought up in a traditional Islamic household in which he studied to become a moulvi.

Career
In 1771, at the age of 21, Qudratullah established a bazaar near the banks of the Manu River using his zamindari land. He started importing edible goods, such as fruits and vegetables opening up opportunities for people to purchase as well as sell. The location allowed easy access through river and land transport.
With his moulvi status, the local people named it as Moulvibazar after him. Some sources mention the bazaar was established in 1810, however.

In 1793, Qudratullah became a Munsif, a local judge of a civil court (similar to the modern-day Indian District Munsiff Court) in Fenchuganj.

Qudratullah passed away on the 12th of February 1839 at 89 years old.

Legacy
The market, which gradually expanded over time to become a town, became headquarters of a South Srihatta (and later South Sylhet) subdivision/mahakuma (consisting of 26 parganas) by the British rule on 1 April 1882. In 1918, the town was made a municipality and in 1930, a pourashava. In 1960, South Sylhet's name was simplified and named after its capital, Moulvibazar, by administrator Dr M A Sattar. On 22 February 1984, the President of Bangladesh, H M Ershad, upgraded its sub-division status to a district as a part of his decentralisation programme.

In 2015, a 5-storey municipal market mall containing up to 36 stores was opened and funded by the Moulvibazar Pourashava and World Bank. The building was named after Moulvi Qudratullah Sattar and cost 300,000 Bangladeshi takas to establish.

To this day, there is a road called Kudrat Ullah Road near Paschim Bazar, Moulvibazar.

See also
Shah Mustafa
Syed Abdul Majid

References

1750 births
1839 deaths
People from Moulvibazar Sadar Upazila
19th-century Indian Muslims
18th-century Indian Muslims
19th-century Bengalis
18th-century Bengalis
Indian people of Arab descent
Indian people of Iraqi descent